The Gombak River is a river which flows through Selangor and Kuala Lumpur in Malaysia. It is a tributary of the Klang River. The point where it meets the Klang River is the origin of Kuala Lumpur's name.

Gombak River was used to be called Sungai Lumpur. Kuala Lumpur's name was taken as it was located in Sungai Lumpur's confluence or "Kuala Lumpur".

Towns along the river basin
 Gombak
 Setapak
 Padang Balang
 Batu
     Taman Melawati, Kuala Lumpur
 Wangsa Maju
 Sentul
 Titiwangsa
 Downtown Kuala Lumpur
 PWTC
 Bandaraya
 Jalan Kuching
 Jalan TAR
 Masjid Jamek

See also
 List of rivers of Malaysia

References

Rivers of Kuala Lumpur
Rivers of Selangor
Klang River
Nature sites of Selangor
Rivers of Malaysia